La Pointe Chausenque, culminating at 3,204 m is a summit in the Massif du Vignemale in the French Pyrenees.

Topography 
Virtually as high as the glacier d'Ossoue to the south, it dominates from 600 m le glacier des Oulettes to the north.It is the highest pyrenean summit located only in France, north of the French-Spanish border.

History 
The first ascent was led out by Vincent de Chausenque and a guide from Cauterets on June 30, 1822. The summit was reached from the Petit Vignemale by the ridge linking both summits.

References 

Mountains of the Pyrenees
Mountains of Hautes-Pyrénées
Pyrenean three-thousanders